Ammonius is a bowl-shaped lunar impact crater with a slightly raised rim. It is located on the floor of the walled plain Ptolemaeus, about 30 kilometers northeast of the crater midpoint.

Just to the north on the lava-flooded floor of Ptolemaeus is a relatively prominent "ghost" crater: the discernible buried rim of a pre-existing crater. The diameter of this ghost crater is nearly double that of Ammonius, and is currently identified as Ptolemaeus B.

Names
The crater is named after Greek philosopher Ammonius Hermiae. In the past this crater was identified as Ptolemaeus A, before being named by the IAU in 1976.

References

External links

Ammonius at The Moon Wiki

Impact craters on the Moon